John III (7 June 1502 – 11 June 1557), nicknamed The Pious (Portuguese: o Piedoso), was the King of Portugal and the Algarves from 1521 until his death in 1557. He was the son of King Manuel I and Maria of Aragon, the third daughter of King Ferdinand II of Aragon and Queen Isabella I of Castile. John succeeded his father in 1521 at the age of nineteen.

During his rule Portuguese possessions were extended in Asia and in the New World through the Portuguese colonization of Brazil. John III's policy of reinforcing Portugal's bases in India (such as Goa) secured Portugal's monopoly over the spice trade of cloves and nutmeg from the Maluku Islands. On the eve of his death in 1557, the Portuguese empire had a global dimension and spanned almost .

During his reign, the Portuguese became the first Europeans to make contact with  Japan (during the Muromachi period). He abandoned the Muslim territories in North Africa in favor of the trade with India and investments in Brazil. In Europe he improved relations with the Baltic region and the Rhineland, hoping that this would bolster Portuguese trade.

Early life

John, the eldest son of King Manuel I born from his second wife Maria of Aragon, was born in Lisbon on 7 June 1502. The event was marked by the presentation of Gil Vicente's Visitation Play or the Monologue of the Cowherd (Auto da Visitação ou Monólogo do Vaqueiro) in the queen's chamber.

The young prince was sworn heir to the throne in 1503, the year his youngest sister, Isabella of Portugal, Empress Consort of the Holy Roman Empire between 1527 and 1538, was born.

John was educated by notable scholars of the time, including the astrologer Tomás de Torres, Diogo de Ortiz, Bishop of Viseu, and Luís Teixeira Lobo, one of the first Portuguese Renaissance humanists, rector of the University of Siena (1476) and Professor of Law at Ferrara (1502).

John's chronicler António de Castilho said that, "Dom João III faced problems easily, complementing his lack of culture with a practice formation that he always showed during his reign" (Elogio d'el rei D. João de Portugal, terceiro, do nome). In 1514 he was given his own house, and a few years later began to help his father in administrative duties.

At the age of sixteen John was chosen to marry his first cousin, the 20-year-old Eleanor of Austria, the eldest daughter of Philip the Handsome of Austria-Burgundy and Queen Joanna of Castile, but instead she married his widowed father Manuel. John took deep offence at this: his chroniclers say he became melancholic and was never quite the same. Some historians also argue this was one of the main reasons that John later became fervently religious, giving him the name of the Pious (Portuguese: o Piedoso).

Initial reign
On 19 December 1521 John was crowned king in the Church of São Domingos in Lisbon, beginning a thirty-six-year reign characterized by extensive activity in internal and overseas politics, especially in relations with other major European states. John III continued the absolutist politics of his predecessors. He called the Portuguese Cortes only three times and at great intervals: 1525 in Torres Novas, 1535 in Évora and 1544 in Almeirim. During the early part of his reign, he also tried to restructure administrative and judicial life in his realm.

The marriage of John's sister Isabella of Portugal to Holy Roman Emperor Charles V, enabled the Portuguese king to forge a stronger alliance with Spain and the Holy Roman Empire. To strengthen his ties with Austria he married his maternal first cousin Catherine of Austria, younger sister of Charles V and his erstwhile fiancée Eleanor, in the town of Crato. John III had nine children from that marriage, but most of them died at young age. By the time of John's death, only his grandson Sebastian was alive to inherit the crown.

Policy

The large and far-flung Portuguese Empire was difficult and expensive to administer and was burdened with huge external debt and trade deficits. Portugal's Indian and Far Eastern interests grew increasingly chaotic under the poor administration of ambitious governors. John III responded with new appointments that proved troubled and short-lived: in some cases, the new governors even had to fight their predecessors to take up their appointments. The resulting failures in administration brought on a gradual decline of the Portuguese trade monopoly. In consideration of the challenging military situation faced by Portuguese forces worldwide, on 7 August 1549 John III declared every male subject between 20 and 65 years old recruitable for military service.

Among John III's many colonial governors in Asia were Vasco da Gama, Pedro Mascarenhas, Lopo Vaz de Sampaio, Nuno da Cunha, Estêvão da Gama, Martim Afonso de Sousa, João de Castro and Henrique de Meneses.
Overseas, the Empire was threatened by the Ottoman Empire in both the Indian Ocean and North Africa, causing Portugal to increase spending on defense and fortifications. Meanwhile in the Atlantic, where Portuguese ships already had to withstand constant attacks of Privateers, an initial settlement of French colonists in Brazil created yet another "front". The French made alliances with native South Americans against the Portuguese and military and political interventions were used. Eventually they were forced out, but not until 1565.

In the first years of John III's reign, explorations in the Far East continued, and the Portuguese reached China and Japan; however these accomplishments were offset by pressure from a strengthening Ottoman Empire under Suleiman the Magnificent, and especially in India, where attacks became more frequent. The expense of defending Indian interests was huge. To pay for it, John III abandoned a number of strongholds in North Africa: Safim, Azamor, Alcácer Ceguer and Arzila.

John III achieved an important political victory in securing the control of the Maluku Islands, the "Spice Islands" claimed by Spain since the Magellan-Elcano circumnavigation. After almost a decade of skirmishes in Southeast Asia, he signed the Treaty of Zaragoza with Emperor Charles V on 22 April 1529. It defined the areas of Spanish and Portuguese influence in Asia and established the anti-meridian to the Treaty of Tordesillas.

International relations
The reign of John III was marked by active diplomacy. With Spain, he made alliances through marriage that ensured peace in the Iberian Peninsula for a number of years. He himself married Catherine of Austria, the daughter of Philip I of Castile. His sister Isabella of Portugal married Charles V, the king of Spain and Holy Roman Emperor. His daughter Maria Manuela married King Philip II of Spain – and there were others. However, the intermarriage of these closely related royal families may have been one of the factors that contributed to the poor health of John's children and of future King Sebastian of Portugal.

John III remained neutral during the war between France and Spain, but stood firm in fighting the attacks of French privateers.

He strengthened relations with the Papal States by introducing the Inquisition in Portugal and the adhesion of the Portuguese clergy to the Counter-Reformation. This relationship with the Catholic Church made it possible for John to name whomever he desired to important religious positions in Portugal: his brothers Henry and Afonso were made Cardinals and his biological son, Duarte; was made Archbishop of Braga.

Commercial relations were intensified with England, the countries of the Baltic regions and Flanders during John III's reign. Meanwhile, in the opposite side of the world, Portugal was the first European nation to make contact with Japan. In China Macau was offered to the Portuguese, and soon Portugal controlled major trade routes in the area. In South Asia, the Portuguese continued its hostile stance against their Muslim rivals and insurgent Indian leaders.

Culture

John III's support for the humanist cause was significant. In literature, his active support of Gil Vicente, Garcia de Resende, Sá de Miranda, Bernardim Ribeiro, Fernão Mendes Pinto, João de Barros and Luís de Camões was notable. About sciences, John III supported the mathematician Pedro Nunes and the physician Garcia de Orta. Through his links to Portuguese humanists such as Luís Teixeira Lobo, Erasmus dedicated his Chrysostomi Lucubrationes to John III of Portugal in 1527.

The monarch awarded many scholarships to universities abroad, mainly in the University of Paris, where fifty Portuguese students were sent to the Collège Sainte-Barbe headed by Diogo de Gouveia. He definitively transferred the Portuguese university from Lisbon to Coimbra in 1537.
In 1542 John III created in Coimbra a College of Arts (Liberal arts) for which he quickly recalled the many prominent Portuguese and European teachers headed by André de Gouveia at the College of Guienne in Bordeaux. Those included George Buchanan, Diogo de Teive, Jerónimo Osório, Nicolas de Grouchy, Guillaume Guérante and Élie Vinet, who were decisive for the dissemination of the contemporary research of Pedro Nunes. The king provided the university with excellent resources. However, the importance of the College was shadowed by rivalry between the orthodox views of the "Parisians" group headed by Diogo de Gouveia and the more secular views of the "Bordeaux" school headed by his nephew André de Gouveia, within the advent of the Counter-Reformation and the influence of the Society of Jesus. The Society of Jesus founded colleges and made education more widely available.

Another noteworthy aspect of John III's rule was the support he gave to missionaries in the New World, Asia and Africa. In 1540, after successive appeals to Pope Paul III asking for missionaries for the Portuguese East Indies under the "Padroado" agreement, John III appointed Francis Xavier to take charge as Apostolic Nuncio. He had been enthusiastically endorsed by Diogo de Gouveia, his teacher at the Collège Sainte-Barbe, and advised the king to draw the youngsters of the newly formed Society of Jesus. The Jesuits were particularly important for mediating Portuguese relations with native peoples.

Inquisition

The Inquisition was introduced into Portugal in 1536. Just like in Spain, the Inquisition was placed under the authority of the king.

The Grand Inquisitor, or General Inquisitor, was named by the Pope after being nominated by the king, and he always came from within the royal family. The Grand Inquisitor would later nominate other inquisitors. In Portugal the first Grand Inquisitor was Cardinal Henry, the king's brother (who would later himself become king).

There were Courts of the Inquisition in Lisbon, Coimbra, Évora and from 1560 onwards, in Goa. The Goa Inquisition changed the demographics of Goa considerably. Goa was called the "Lisbon of the Far East" and trade reached a new level.

The Portuguese did not leave Goa undeveloped, but rather they introduced modern architecture and built strong roads and bridges that have stood the test of time even today.

The activities of the Inquisition extended from book censorship, repression and trial for divination, witchcraft and bigamy, as well as the prosecution of sexual crimes, especially sodomy.

Originally created to punish religious deviance, the Inquisition came to have influence in almost every aspect of Portuguese society: politics, culture and social habits.

Imperial management

Luso-African relations
In John III's time, trade between the Portuguese and Africans was extremely intense in feitorias such Arguim, Mina, Mombasa, Sofala or Mozambique. Under John III, several expeditions started in coastal Africa and advanced to the interior of the continent. These expeditions were formed by groups of navigators, merchants, adventurers and missionaries. Missions in Africa were established by the College of Arts of Coimbra. The objective was to increase the king's dominion, develop peaceful relations and to Christianize the indigenous peoples. Relations with local rulers were often complicated by trade in slaves, as shown by John's correspondence with them.

John III refused to abandon all of the Portuguese North African strongholds, but he had to make choices based on the economic or strategic value of each possession. John III decided to leave Safim and Azamor in 1541, followed by Arzila and Alcácer Ceguer in 1549. The fortresses of Ceuta, Tangiers and Mazagan were strengthened "to face the new military techniques, imposed by the generalization of heavy artillery, combined with light fire weapons and blades".

John III's court jester was João de Sá Panasco, a black African, who was eventually admitted to the prestigious Order of Saint James based on his service in the Conquest of Tunis (1535).

Luso-Asian relations

Before the reign of John III, the Portuguese had already reached Siam (1511), the Maluku Islands (1512), the Chinese littoral (1513), Canton (1517) and Timor (1515). During John's rule the Portuguese reached Japan, and at the end of John's reign Macau was offered to Portugal by China. From India, John III imported an amazing variety of spices, herbs, minerals, and fabrics; from Malacca, exotic woods and spice; from Bengala, fabrics and exotic foodstuffs; from Alexandria and Cairo, exotic woods, metals, minerals, fabrics, and boullion; and from China, musk, rhubarb, & silk in exchange for gromwells, pearls, horses from Arabia and Persia, non-worked silk, silk embroidery threads, fruits of the date palm, raisins, salt, sulphur and many other goods.

As Muslims and other peoples constantly attacked Portuguese fleets in India, and because it was so far away from mainland Portugal, it was extremely difficult for John III to secure Portuguese dominion in this area. A viceroy (or Governor-General with extensive powers) was nominated, but it was not enough to defend the Portuguese possessions in India. The Portuguese started by creating feitorias – commercial strongholds in Cochin, Cannanore, Coulão, Cranganore and Tanor – with the initial objective of establishing just a commercial dominion in the region.

The hostility of many Indian kingdoms and alliances between sultans and zamorins with the intent of expelling the Portuguese made it necessary for the Europeans to establish a sovereign state. Portugal thus militarily occupied some key cities on the Indian coast and Goa became the headquarters of the Portuguese Empire in the East as of 1512. Goa became a starting point for the introduction of European cultural and religious values in India, and churches, schools and hospitals were built. Goa remained an overseas possession of Portugal until India reclaimed it in 1961.

The Portuguese arrived in Japan in 1543. Japan had been known in Portugal since the time of Marco Polo, who called it "Cipango". Whether Portuguese nationals were the first Europeans to arrive in Japan is debated. Some say the first Portuguese arrival was the writer Fernão Mendes Pinto, while others say it was the navigators António Peixoto, António da Mota and Francisco Zeimoto.

Portuguese traders started negotiating with Japan as early as of 1550 and established a base there in Nagasaki. By then, trade with Japan was a Portuguese monopoly under the rule of a Captain. Because the Portuguese established themselves in Macau, Chinese commercial relations and the silver trade with Japan were improved under John III's rule.

After the voyage of Ferdinand Magellan, the Crown of Castile claimed the recently discovered Maluku Islands. In 1524, a conference of experts (cartographers, cosmographers, pilots, etc.) was held to solve the dispute caused by the difficulty of determining the meridian agreed to in the Treaty of Tordesillas. The Portuguese delegation sent by John III included names such as António de Azevedo Coutinho, Diogo Lopes de Sequeira, Lopo Homem and Simão Fernandes. The dispute was settled in 1529 by the Treaty of Zaragoza, signed by John III and Charles I of Spain. The Portuguese paid 350.000 gold ducados to Spain and secured their presence in the islands, which not have been necessary, since Portugal was actually entitled to the islands according to the Treaty of Tordesillas.

In 1553, Leonel de Sousa obtained authorization for the Portuguese to establish themselves in Canton and Macau. Macau was later offered to John III as a reward for Portuguese assistance against maritime piracy in the period between 1557 and 1564. Malacca, which controlled the eponymous Strait of Malacca, was vital to Portuguese interests in the Far East. After an unsuccessful expedition in 1509, Malacca was finally captured by Afonso de Albuquerque, the Portuguese viceroy of India, on 24 August 1511. Malacca was later taken by the Dutch in 1641.

In order to follow its trade routes to the Far East, Portugal depended on the seasonal monsoon winds in the Indian Ocean. In winter the prevailing northeasterly monsoon impeded travel to India; in summer the southwest monsoon made departure from India difficult. As a result, Portugal decided that it needed permanent bases in India in addition to its ports in Africa, to pass the time while the wind was changing. In addition to Goa, they established themselves in Ceylon (in what is now Sri Lanka) through the conquest of several Ceylonese kingdoms in the sixteenth century. Portuguese Ceylon remained in Portuguese hands until 1658, when it was seized by the Dutch after an epic siege.

Portuguese America

During the reign of King John III the Portuguese Empire established itself in South America with the foundation of the twelve Captaincy Colonies of Brazil (from 1534 onwards). Each with its own donatary captain, the twelve colonies worked independently. In 1549, John III established the Governorate General of Brazil, and the twelve captaincy colonies became subordinate to it. The first Governor-General appointed by John III, Tomé de Sousa, founded the city of Salvador, Bahia (São Salvador da Bahia de Todos os Santos) in 1549.  For his role in the colonization of South America, John III has been referred to as The Colonizer (Portuguese: "o Colonizador").

Immediately following the discovery of Brazil in 1500, the Portuguese imported brazilwood, Indian slaves and exotic birds from there. Brazilian wood was a very appreciated product in Europe because it could be used to produce a type of red dye. During John III's rule, after the initial colonization, Portuguese explorers intensified the search for brazilwood and began the cultivation of sugarcane, which was well suited to the climate of Brazil and especially around Recife and Bahía.

In the final years of John's reign Portugal's colony of Brazil was just beginning its rapid development as a producer of sugar that compensated for the gradual decline of revenues from Asia, a development that would continue during the reign of his grandson and successor, Sebastian (1557–1578). Since Brazil lacked a large native population and the ones who lived there weren't adapted to the strenuous work required in the plantation fields, the Portuguese colonists began importing African slaves to strengthen the workforce present in the territory.. The first slaves, from the region of Guinea, arrived in Brazil in 1539. Most of them worked in the sugarcane fields or served as house servants.

Death and dynastic issue 
From 1539, the heir to the throne was João Manuel, Prince of Portugal, who married Joanna of Austria, Princess of Portugal, daughter of Charles V. The sole son of John III to survive childhood, Prince John, was sick and died at young age (of juvenile diabetes), eighteen days before his wife gave birth to Prince Sebastian on 20 January 1554. When John III died of apoplexy in 1557, his only heir was his three-year-old grandson, Sebastian.
John III's body rests in the Monastery of Jerónimos in Lisbon.

Style

Like his predecessors John III used the style "El-rei" (the king) followed by "Dom" (abbreviated to D.), a mark of high esteem for a distinguished Christian nobleman.

The official style was the same used by his father Manuel I: "Dom João, by the grace of God, King of Portugal, of the Algarves, of either side of the sea in Africa, Lord of Guinea, & of the Conquest, Navigation, & Commerce of Ethiopia, Arabia, Persia, & India" (Dom João, por graça de Deus, Rei de Portugal, e dos Algarves, d'aquém e d'além mar em África, Senhor da Guiné, e da Conquista, Navegação, & Comércio da Etiópia, Arábia, Pérsia, & Índia). This style would only change in the 19th century when Brazil became a Vice-Kingdom.

Ancestry

In popular culture
John III of Portugal figures in José Saramago's 2008 novel The Elephant's Journey.

John III (attributed as João III) is the leader of Portugal as part of the New Frontier Pass DLC in the grand-strategy game Civilization VI.

John III features in Laurent Binet's 2021 novel Civilizations.

See also 
Descendants of Manuel I of Portugal

Notes

References

 Serrão, Joel (dir.) (1971). Dicionário da História de Portugal, Vol. II. Lisboa: Iniciativas Editoriais
 Domingues, Mário (1962). D. João III O Homem e a Sua Época. Lisboa: Edição Romano Torres
 Serrão, Joaquim Veríssimo (1978). História de Portugal, Vol. III. Lisboa: Verbo
 Mattoso, José (dir.) (1993). História de Portugal, Vol. III.Círculo de Leitores
 Paulo Drummond Braga, D. João III (Lisbon: Hugin, 2002) is the most recent and best biography.
 Cambridge History of Latin America, ed. Leslie Bethell (Cambridge, 1984): chapter by Harold Johnson for the early history of Brasil.
 Alexandre Herculano, História da Origem e Estabelecimento da Inquisição em Portugal, 3 vols. (Lisbon, 1879–80) for the negotiations leading to the creation of the Inquisition.
 

|-

1502 births
1557 deaths
Portuguese infantes
Princes of Portugal
House of Aviz
Knights of the Golden Fleece
Portuguese Inquisition
16th-century Portuguese monarchs
Portuguese colonization of the Americas
People from Lisbon
Maritime history of Portugal